Molecular layer may refer to:

 Molecular layer of cerebellar cortex
 Molecular layer of cerebral cortex
 Molecular layer of dentate gyrus